Lode coordinates  or Haigh–Westergaard coordinates . are a set of tensor invariants that span the space of real, symmetric, second-order, 3-dimensional tensors and are isomorphic with respect to principal stress space. This right-handed orthogonal coordinate system is named in honor of the German scientist Dr. Walter Lode because of his seminal paper written in 1926 describing the effect of the middle principal stress on metal plasticity. Other examples of sets of tensor invariants are the set of principal stresses  or the set of kinematic invariants . The Lode coordinate system can be described as a cylindrical coordinate system within principal stress space with a coincident origin and the z-axis parallel to the vector .

Mechanics invariants
The Lode coordinates are most easily computed using the mechanics invariants. These invariants are a mixture of the invariants of the Cauchy stress tensor, and the stress deviator, and are given by

which can be written equivalently in Einstein notation

The gradients of these invariants can be calculated by

Axial coordinate 

The -coordinate is found by calculating the magnitude of the orthogonal projection of the stress state onto the hydrostatic axis.

where

is the unit normal in the direction of the hydrostatic axis.

Radial coordinate 

The -coordinate is found by calculating the magnitude of the stress deviator (the orthogonal projection of the stress state into the deviatoric plane).

where

{| class="toccolours collapsible collapsed" width="50%" style="text-align:left"
!Derivation
|-
|The relation that  can be found by expanding the relation

and writing  in terms of the isotropic and deviatoric parts while expanding the magnitude of 

.

Which leaves us with

Applying the identity  and using the definition of 

|}

is a unit tensor in the direction of the radial component.

Lode angle – angular coordinate 

The Lode angle can be considered, rather loosely, a measure of loading type. The Lode angle varies with respect to the middle eigenvalue of the stress.

and are related by

{| class="toccolours collapsible collapsed" width="50%" style="text-align:left"
!Derivation
|-

.

Because cosine is an even function and the range of the inverse cosine is usually  we take the negative possible value for the  term, thus ensuring that  is positive.

|}

.

Meridional profile

It is commonly used to demonstrate the pressure dependence of a yield surface or the pressure-shear trajectory of a stress path. Because  is non-negative the plot usually omits the negative portion of the -axis, but can be included to illustrate effects at opposing Lode angles (usually triaxial extension and triaxial compression).

If a non-isomorphic pair is used for the meridional profile then the normal to the yield surface will not appear normal in the meridional profile. As an example, pressure  and the Von Mises stress  are not an isomorphic coordinate pair and, therefore, distort the yield surface because

and, finally, .

Octahedral profile

The octahedral profile is a 2D plot of  holding  constant. Plotting the yield surface in the octahedral plane demonstrates the level of Lode angle dependence. The octahedral plane is sometimes referred to as the 'pi plane' or 'deviatoric plane'.

The octahedral profile is not necessarily constant for different values of pressure with the notable exceptions of the von Mises yield criterion and the Tresca yield criterion which are constant for all values of pressure.

A note on terminology

The term Haigh-Westergaard space is ambiguously used in the literature to mean both the Cartesian principal stress space and the cylindrical Lode coordinate space

See also
 Yield (engineering)
 Plasticity (physics)
 Stress
 Henri Tresca
 von Mises stress
 Mohr–Coulomb theory
 Strain
 Strain tensor
 Stress–energy tensor
 Stress concentration
 3-D elasticity

References

Solid mechanics
Materials science